Hwang Sun-hui (3 May 1919 – 17 January 2020) was a North Korean politician who served in several high-ranking positions in the Workers' Party of Korea (WPK), including in the Supreme People's Assembly and the Central Committee of the WPK. She was affiliated with the Korean Revolution Museum from 1965, and was its director from 1990.

Career

Hwang Sun-hui was born on 3 May 1919 near the border between Japanese Korea and the Republic of China. Yonhap lists her place of birth as North Hamgyong Province, although some sources such as the KCNA and the South Korean Ministry of Unification list her as being born in Helong or Yanji, China. She served as a guerrilla in the 88th Special Independent Sniper Brigade of the Soviet Far East Command during the Second Sino-Japanese War and World War II. Her duties included sewing, cooking, and nursing. There she met Kim Il-sung and her future husband Ryu Kyong-su. Hwang returned to North Korea in November 1945. She would play a key political role in the nascent North Korean state.

Her first post of political significance was as the chairwoman of the provincial committee of the Korean Democratic Women's Union (KDWU) for Ryanggang Province in March 1956. She was made a member of the central executive committee of the whole KDWU in August 1969, the director of its central committee in October 1971, and the vice chairwoman of the organization in December 1977.

Hwang was made an alternate member in the Central Committee of the Workers' Party of Korea (WPK) in September 1961. She was elected full member in November 1969 and again in October 1980. In September 2010, she was again on the central committee, this time as an alternate member.

Hwang became affiliated with the Korean Revolution Museum in October 1965 when she became the chairwoman of its party committee. She was made secretary of the committee in June 1973 and again in July 1988. Hwang became the director of the museum in April 1990.

Hwang was a deputy to the 3rd, 4th, 5th, 7th, 8th, 9th, 10th, and 13th Supreme People's Assemblies. Hwang was on the funeral committees of Kim Il-sung (1994, ranked 6th), O Jin-u (1995), Choe Kwang (1997, 28th), and Jon Mun-sop (1998). Hwang was awarded the Order of Labor in May 1979, Order of Kim Il-sung in April 1982, and "Double Hero" in April 1992. She was awarded the Jubilee Medal "70 Years of Victory in the Great Patriotic War 1941–1945" on 6 May 2015 by Vladimir Putin.

Public image
Hwang Sun-hui was married to Ryu Kyong-su. Ryu was a hero of the Korean War, leading a brigade of the 105th Armored Division into Seoul as the first armored unit. His unit hoisted the North Korean flag at Seoul City Hall. This association with her husband gave Hwang "unrivalled rank in the party". The two had a daughter, Ryu Chu-ok, who is married to Kim Chang-son, also a prominent WPK politician.

Hwang was one of very few women on the Central Committee of the WPK, and one of its oldest members. As a former guerrilla, her membership in the central committee was considered ceremonially important.

Hwang was considered one of the original supporters of the Kim dynasty. All three Kims appeared with her over the decades, making her a permanent living propaganda exhibit from the early days of the Kim regime until she died. The leader of North Korea hugging Hwang was a familiar sight in the country. Kim Jong-un was seen hugging her in his first year as the supreme leader, again in 2013, and in 2017 when he visited Hwang—who by this point in her life used a wheelchair—at the Korean Revolution Museum. One defector noted, "Hwang has been so squeezed that she must not have any juice left in her".

Hwang Sun-hui died at age 100 on 17 January 2020, and her bier was attended by Kim Jong-un and his wife. Following her death, the Korean Central News Agency described Hwang as "a steadfast female revolutionary who dedicated her all to the accomplishment of the revolutionary cause of Juche pioneered on Mount Paekdu". She was given a state funeral with the following members on her funeral committee chaired by Choe Ryong-hae:

 Choe Ryong-hae
 Pak Pong-ju
 Kim Jae-ryong
 Ri Man-gon
 Ri Il-hwan
 Choe Hwi 
 Ri Pyong-chol
 Kim Tok-hun
 Pak Thae-dok
 Pak Thae-song
 Kim Yong-chol
 Choe Pu-il
 Kim Su-kil
 Thae Hyong-chol
 O Su-yong
 Jong Kyong-thaek
 Kim Hyong-jun
 Ho Chol-man
 Ri Ho-rim
 Cho Yong-won
 Pak Jong-chon
 Kim Jong-kwan
 Im Chol-ung
 Ri Ryong-nam
 Kim Il-chol
 
 Tong Jong-ho
 Chon Kwang-ho
 
 Pak Yong-il
 Pak Kyong-suk
 Ri Yong-suk
 
 Ri Yong-rae
 
 Kim Jun-son
 O Il-jong
 
 Kim Ki-nam
 Ri Yong-sik
 Kim Cho-kuk
 Kim Nung-o
 Pak Jong-nam
 Ri Hi-yong
 Kim Tu-il
 Mun Kyong-dok
 Ri Chol-man
 
 Kang Pong-hun
 Kim Song-il
 Kim Yong-hwan
 
 
 
 
 Son Yong-hun
 
 
 
 
 So Hong-chan
 
 
 
 Kim Song-chol
 Kang Sun-nam
 Ri Tong-chun
 Ri Yong-ju
 O Kum-chol

Awards and honors 
A frame displaying Hwang's decorations was placed at the foot of her bier during her funeral.

References

Works cited

Further reading
 

1919 births
2020 deaths
Workers' Party of Korea politicians
Women centenarians
North Korean centenarians
20th-century North Korean women politicians
20th-century North Korean politicians
North Korean military personnel
Military personnel of the Second Sino-Japanese War
Soviet military personnel of World War II
Female military personnel
Recipients of the Order of Kim Il-sung
People of 88th Separate Rifle Brigade